Ethnikos Latsion is a Cypriot association football club based in Latsia, located in the Nicosia District. Its stadium is the Latsia Municipal Stadium and its colours are blue and white. In 2009, Ethnikos Latsion was promoted to the Cypriot Fourth Division from the Cypriot Confederation of Local Federations, although they lost the playoff match against Dynamo Pervolion with 1–4, because of an objection made. They have won the 1994–95 Cypriot Third Division.

Sources 
This article was based on the Greek-language article.

Football clubs in Cyprus
Association football clubs established in 1956
1956 establishments in Cyprus